Volya is a rural locality (a settlement) and the administrative center of Volenskoye Rural Settlement, Novousmansky District, Voronezh Oblast, Russia. The population was  7,803 as of 2010. There are 44 streets.

Geography 
Volya is located 17 km northeast of Novaya Usman (the district's administrative centre) by road. Orlovo is the nearest rural locality.

References 

Rural localities in Novousmansky District